"Spanish Guitar" is a song by American singer Toni Braxton from her third studio album, The Heat (2000). It was released on September 25, 2000, as the album's third single. The song was written by Diane Warren and produced by David Foster. It was never released as a commercial single in the United States, where the song reached number 98 on the Billboard Hot 100.

Critical reception
The song received mixed reviews from music critics. Stephen Thomas Erlewine from AllMusic called it "an effective ballad" and picked it one of the best songs of the album, alongside "He Wasn't Man Enough" and "Just Be a Man About It". CD Universe was largely positive, writing that "the appropriately titled 'Spanish Guitar' marks an interruption of the other songs' predominantly electronic textures while remaining consistent with the sensuous, romantic mood." Barry Walters wrote favorably for Rolling Stone, stating that "Braxton's supple alto rests easily within mainstream R&B's smooove sonic furniture, her croons displaying husky quirks as the track goes through the multiplatinum motions on 'Spanish Guitar,' a Latin-conscious 'Un-Break My Heart' clone."

However, Colin Ross wrote a mixed review for PopMatters, writing that the song is "overly dramatic and fairly uninspiring." Amazon's Bob Roget agreed, calling it a "weightless trifle".

Music video
The music video for "Spanish Guitar" opens with Braxton floating on top of the water. The scene quickly changes to a crowded cafe and centers on a man (portrayed by Kamar de los Reyes) playing the guitar. The scene changes to a modern white and red room where Braxton, wearing a red dress, sings her longing to be in his arms. There are several shots of him playing the guitar with the guitar morphing into Braxton in his arms. Towards the end, he and Braxton have a dance scene together. The video was directed by Billie Woodruff, who also directed the videos for "Un-Break My Heart", "He Wasn't Man Enough", and "Just Be a Man About It".

Track listings
 German and Australian CD maxi single
 "Spanish Guitar" (radio mix) – 4:30
 "Spanish Guitar" (Mousse T.'s radio mix) – 4:07
 "Spanish Guitar" (HQ² radio edit) – 4:11
 "Spanish Guitar" (Royal Garden Flamenco mix) – 4:35
 "Spanish Guitar" (Eiffel 65 radio edit) – 4:30

 German and Australian CD maxi single (The Remixes)
 "Spanish Guitar" (radio mix) – 4:30
 "Spanish Guitar" (Mousse T.'s extended mix) – 6:53
 "Spanish Guitar" (HQ² Mix) – 8:54
 "Spanish Guitar" (Mousse T.'s Deep Vocal mix) – 8:32
 "Spanish Guitar" (Eiffel 65 extended mix) – 6:54

 German CD single
 "Spanish Guitar" (radio mix) – 4:20
 "Spanish Guitar" (Royal Garden's Flamenco mix) – 4:35

 US 12-inch single set
A1. "Spanish Guitar" (HQ² mix) – 8:54
A2. "Spanish Guitar" (HQ² radio edit) – 4:10
B3. "Spanish Guitar" (Mousse T.'s Deep Vocal mix) – 8:32
B4. "Spanish Guitar" (Mousse T.'s radio edit) – 4:02
C5. "Spanish Guitar" (Eiffel 65 extended mix) – 6:54
C6. "Spanish Guitar" (Eiffel 65 TV edit) – 6:53
D7. "Spanish Guitar" (Mousse T.'s extended mix) – 6:53
D8. "Spanish Guitar" (Royal Garden Flamenco mix) – 4:34
D9. "Spanish Guitar" (album version) – 4:25

Charts

Weekly charts

Year-end charts

Release history

Notes

References

2000 singles
2000 songs
2000s ballads
Contemporary R&B ballads
LaFace Records singles
Latin pop songs
Music videos directed by Bille Woodruff
Pop ballads
Song recordings produced by David Foster
Songs written by Diane Warren
Toni Braxton songs